The Sikorsky S-73 was a proposed aircraft design to meet the United States Army requirement in 1970 for a Heavy Lift Helicopter (HLH) capable of carrying , a lifting capacity more than twice that of Sikorsky's most powerful helicopter at that time.

The Sikorsky's S-73 design was an enlarged version of the successful CH-54/S-64 with a simplified and improved single main rotor powered by three General Electric TF34-58 turboshaft engines rated at a combined . A crew of five would operate the aircraft from the forward cockpit with pushbuttons replacing the traditional cyclic stick and collective lever. Behind the cockpit an aft cabin provided capacity for 12 combat troops.

Sikorsky submitted their design in February 1971, then in May the Army declared the Boeing Vertol XCH-62 winner of the contract, ending the Sikorsky S-73 program.

Specifications

See also

References

Sikorsky aircraft
Three-turbine helicopters
United States military helicopters